Bachhuber is a German surname.

Notable people with this surname include:
 Andrew Bachhuber (1856–?), American farmer and politician
 Frank E. Bachhuber (1884–1939), American politician
 Martin Bachhuber (born 1955), German politician
 Max Bachhuber (1832–1879), American farmer and politician
 Nina Lola Bachhuber (born 1971), German artist
 Ruth Bachhuber Doyle (October 14, 1916 – May 6, 2006), American politician